The 1932–33 season was Madrid Football Club's 31st season in existence, and their 5th consecutive season in the Primera División. The club also played in the Campeonato Regional Mancomunado (Joint Regional Championship) and the Copa del Presidente de la República (renamed Copa del Rey after the arrival of the Second Spanish Republic).

Madrid FC secured their second consecutive Primera División title, equaling Athletic Bilbao for most La Liga title wins, and were close to clinching the domestic double, but lost in the Copa final to Bilbao 1–2.

Friendlies

Competitions

La Liga

League table

Matches

Campeonato Regional Mancomunado

Matches

Copa del Presidente de la República

Final

Notes

References

1932–33
Spanish football clubs 1932–33 season
Spanish football championship-winning seasons